Champion Lakes Regatta Centre (generally referred to as  Champion Lakes) is an aquatic sporting facility south of Perth, Western Australia in the suburb of Champion Lakes. It cost approximately over 30 million dollars to build.  It is an international standard facility for rowing, kayaking and
dragon boat racing and includes a  buoyed course for competition.

The facility is owned by VenuesWest and is situated adjacent to Tonkin Highway.   It was officially opened on 30 January 2009.

The establishment of the Champion Lakes Regatta Centre has provided students from schools like Kelmscott Senior High with opportunities to participate in rowing competitions held most Saturdays during the school year. Not only is it used by schools but it is also open to the public all days of the week. 

 there are no planned future events at the facility.

Previous Events
 PSA Head of the River - 28 March 2009
 Australian Masters Rowing Regatta - 3 - 6 June 2010
 Australian Rowing Championships - 5 - 11 March 2012

References

Sports venues in Perth, Western Australia
Rowing venues in Australia
Canoeing and kayaking venues in Australia